Ekaterina Sokolova (née Sosinova) (born 29 August 1990) is a former pair skater. She competed internationally for Israel with pairs partner and husband Fedor Sokolov. They are two-time Israeli national champions.

Personal life 
Ekaterina Sokolova was born in Moscow, Russian SFSR, Soviet Union and was raised in Russia. Sokolova and Sokolov were married in March 2008 in Moscow.

Career 
Sokolov and Sokolova began skating together in 2003. They originally represented Russia. They decided to represent Azerbaijan internationally in the 2006-2007 season but withdrew from the 2007 European Championships due to a problem with paperwork regarding their country change. They never successfully represented Azerbaijan in ISU competition.

They decided to compete for Israel in 2007. They won the 2008 Israeli national pairs title and placed 12th at the 2008 European Championships. The pair made their Grand Prix debut at the 2008 Cup of Russia, where they placed 8th. At the 2008-2009 Israeli Championships, they won the Israeli national title for the second time.

She began using her married name professionally in the 2008-2009 season.

They withdrew from the 2009 European Championships mid-competition due to injury.

Programs

Competitive highlights
(with Sokolov for Israel)

 WD = Withdrawn

(with Sokolov for Azerbaijan)

 WD = Withdrawn

References

External links
 Official site
 

1990 births
Living people
Israeli female pair skaters
Russian female pair skaters
Figure skaters from Moscow